Coccosteus (from  , 'berry' and   'bone') is an extinct genus of arthrodire placoderm from the Devonian period. Its fossils have been found throughout Europe and North America. The majority of these have been found in freshwater sediments, though such a large range suggests that they may have been able to enter saltwater.

Description

Like all other arthrodires, Coccosteus had a joint between the armor of the body and skull. It also had an internal joint between its neck vertebrae and the back of the skull, allowing for the mouth to be opened even wider. Along with the longer jaws, this allowed Coccosteus to feed on fairly large prey. The up-and-down movement of the skull also allowed for more water to be pumped through the gills. Possibly, the creature supplemented its diet with organic material filtered from mud using the gills. As with all other arthrodires, Coccosteus had bony dental plates embedded in its jaws, forming a beak. The beak was kept sharp by having the edges of the dental plates grind away at each other. Overall the creature looked similar to its gigantic cousin Dunkleosteus, save that its eyes were closer to the end of its snout than in its larger relative.

Phylogeny

Coccosteus is the type genus for family Coccosteidae, which belongs to the clade Coccosteomorphi, one of the two major clades within Eubrachythoraci. The cladogram below shows the phylogeny of Coccosteus:

Species

 C. cuspidatus is the type species, and is an important index fossil in the continental Devonian sequence of northern Scotland deposited in the Orcadian Basin. It is only present at and below the Upper Eifelian Achanarras limestone level.

See also 
 List of placoderms

References 

Coccosteidae
Middle Devonian fish
Late Devonian fish
Placoderms of North America
Placoderms of Europe
Devonian Scotland
Fossils of Scotland
Fossil taxa described in 1841
Taxa named by Louis Agassiz